Killa Kali is the second solo studio album by American rapper Celly Cel. It was released in 1996 through Sick Wid It/Jive Records. Recording sessions took place at K-Lou Studios in Richmond and at the Mob Shop in Vallejo. Production was handled by K-Lou, Kevin Gardner, Redwine, Emgee, Sean T, Studio Ton, Tone Capone, and Celly Cel himself, who also served as executive producer. It features guest appearances from B-Legit, E-40, Spice 1, Felisha, Kerry, and L.I.T. The album peaked at number 26 on the Billboard 200 and number 4 on the Top R&B/Hip-Hop Albums chart. The album featured three singles, "4 tha Scrilla", "It's Goin' Down" and "Can't Tell Me Shit".

Track listing

Charts

Weekly Charts

Year-End Charts

References

External links

1995 albums
Celly Cel albums
Sick Wid It Records albums
Albums produced by Studio Ton